Synanthedon colchidensis is a moth of the family Sesiidae. It is restricted to the Caucasian Mountains.

The larvae feed on Abies nordmanniana. They live in swellings caused by a fungus. In springtime, the larva constructs a very characteristic exit tube from the root to ground level.

References

Moths described in 1992
Sesiidae